The 2022–23 season is Linfield's 122nd season in the top flight of the Northern Ireland Football League having never been relegated since the leagues formation in 1890.  In addition to the domestic league, they will also compete in the Irish Cup, the League Cup, the County Antrim Shield, the Scottish Challenge Cup, the UEFA Champions League, UEFA Europa League and UEFA Europa Conference League.

Overview

Results and fixtures

Pre-season
Linfield announced the first of their friendlies on 19 May stating they would be playing Newtown and St Mirren at home in preparation for their Champions League 1st Qualifying Round tie.  A further 2 fixtures against Knockbreda and Harland & Wolff Welders, both to be held away from home were announced on 9 June.  While on a pre-season training camp in Marbella, Linfield announced they would be playing Qatar at the end of the camp.  The final pre-season friendly was announced as being against Loughgall as a testimonial match for Loughgall Player Steven Ferguson.

NIFL Charity Shield

NIFL Premiership

County Antrim Shield

Scottish Challenge Cup

UEFA Champions League

First qualifying round

Second qualifying round

UEFA Europa League

Third qualifying round

UEFA Conference League

Play-off round

Club statistics

Competition Overview

League table

Transfers

In

Out

References 

Linfield F.C. seasons
Linfield